IA: The Journal of the Society for Industrial Archeology is a biannual peer-reviewed academic journal published by the Society for Industrial Archeology, currently edited by Steven Walton (Michigan Technological University). IA publishes scholarly research, essays, and reviews of books published in the field of industrial archeology.

History
The first issue of IA was published in 1975, followed by one issue per year through volume 11 in 1985. The current biannual publication frequency began with volume 12 in 1986, although there have been several double issues.

IA has published a number of issues with articles on a common theme, including Montréal's Lachine Canal (2003), the Springfield Armory (1988), the West Point Foundry (2009), and three on the Historic American Engineering Record (1997, 1999, and 2018).

References

External links

Biannual journals
English-language journals
Industrial archaeology
Archaeology journals
Publications established in 1975